In the 1957 Virginia gubernatorial election, incumbent Governor Thomas B. Stanley, a Democrat, was unable to seek re-election due to term limits. Virginia State Senator Theodore Roosevelt Dalton was once again nominated by the Republican Party to run against former Democratic Attorney General of Virginia J. Lindsay Almond.

Candidates
J. Lindsay Almond, former Attorney General of Virginia (D)
Theodore Roosevelt Dalton, Virginia State Senator (R)

Results

References

Gubernatorial
1957
Virginia
November 1957 events in the United States